The Olowo's palace, Aghọfẹn Ọlọghọ, is the largest palace in Africa. It is located in Owo, a local government area in Ondo State, and has been dubbed a national monument by the federal government of Nigeria. Ther palace features 100 courtyards, called Ugha, that each have a specific function and address a specific deity.

The palace sits on 180 acres of land. It is claimed to be twice the size of an American football field and is used for ceremonies and public assemblies.

Some of the courtyards are paved with quartz pebbles and others with broken pottery. Pillars supporting each roof in the veranda are moulded with statues of a king mounted on a horse or shown with his senior wife.

About 13 monarchs have used the palace since the first Olowo of Owo. They are (not in order): Oba Ojugbelu Arere, Rerengejen, Ajaka, Ajagbusi Ekun, Olagbegi Atanneye I, Olagbegi Atanneye II, Elewuokun, Olateru Olagbegi I, Olateru Olagbegi II, Ajike Ogunoye, Adekola Ogunoye II, and Folagbade Olateru Olagbegi III.

The Ólówó's palace is located in the heart of the town, and is surrounded by trees and other artifacts.

The palace was built during the reign of Olowo Irengenje in 1340 and has approximately 1,000 rooms, some of which served as shrines and places of worship of ancestors.

Owo was regarded by many as the political Mecca of Yorubaland before Nigeria's independence. The palace took part in that as the formation of the Action group that transformed from Egbe Omo Yoruba took place within the palace.

References 

Ondo State